Live at El Morro, Puerto Rico is the fourth live album by Yanni, released on the Yanni/Wake label in 2012. The two concerts were performed outdoors on the grounds of El Morro castle in San Juan, Puerto Rico in December 2011.

The CD peaked at #1 on Billboard's New Age Album list in both 2012 and 2013.

Background
Live at El Morro, Puerto Rico was recorded and filmed during two sold-out concerts performed outdoors on December 16 and 17, 2011, on the grounds of the Castillo San Felipe del Morro ("El Morro"), a UNESCO World Heritage Site in the Old San Juan. Yanni had reportedly planned for twenty years to perform at the historic site.

Yanni explained that two concerts were planned, for Friday and Saturday night, with the ensuing Sunday being a contingent rain day. It reportedly rained for 25 days in a row preceding the first night's concert on Friday, and the first concert itself was interrupted and eventually cut short three-quarters of the way through, by rain and wind causing danger for the outdoor performance.

The evening of the second show, Saturday, the weather was better and the show was completed as planned. Yanni said that 35 cameras, and three live camera operators, were able to capture the show. Departing the island on Sunday, the planned rain day, Yanni noted that it was raining and he could not have carried out a make-up concert then.

Yanni later remarked that "the weather became part of the show," but that it was the first time in his thirty-year career that a concert had been stopped. To individuals affected by the Friday evening concert that was cut short, the concert's production, José Dueño Entertainment, offered rain checks on tickets towards the next Yanni concert in Puerto Rico or any other José Dueño Entertainment production, and a certificate valid towards receiving the concert DVD.

The concerts involved sale of over 10,000 tickets, and cost $3 million to put on.

The concerts were the subject of special broadcasts on PBS beginning in March 2012, the video having been recorded in high definition. The production was Yanni's tenth collaboration with PBS.

The Live at El Morro, Puerto Rico CD peaked as Billboard's #1 New Age Album (2012 and 2013), at #109 on the Billboard 200 (2012), and debuted at #52 on the Canadian Albums Chart.

Album track listing
CD:

DVD track listing
Video DVD:

DVD Extras:
 Yanni in Puerto Rico
 Making of the Show

Musicians and vocalists

Musicians: (alphabetically)
Charles Adams: drums
Benedikt Brydern: violin
Jason Carder: trumpet and flugelhorn
Yoel Del Sol: percussion
Víctor Espínola: harp
Ming Freeman: keyboards
James Mattos: French horn
Sarah O’Brien: cello
Mary Simpson: violin
Dana Teboe: trombone
Gabriel Vivas: bass
Samvel Yervinyan: violin
Alexander Zhiroff: cello

Vocalists: (alphabetically)
Lauren Jelencovich
Lisa Lavie

References

Further reading
 Scully, Alan, "Yanni: Show goes on and on" (archive), The Bakersfield Californian, July 11, 2012.
 Olsen, John P., "Concert Review: Yanni-Live at El Morro, Puerto Rico" (archive), New Age Music World, April 12, 2012.

External links
Official Website
Live at El Morro, Puerto Rico at AllMusic
YouTube video "All Access: Yanni on Tour - San Juan, Puerto Rico (Part 1)" (posted July 4, 2012)
U.S. National Park Service's website "The Gibraltar of the Caribbean" for San Juan National Historic Site which includes Castillo San Felipe del Morro

Concert films
Yanni albums
Yanni live albums
Yanni video albums
Yanni concert tours
2012 live albums
Live instrumental albums